Brendan Williams (born 21 May 1978 in Urbenville) is a retired Australian-born rugby union player. He played at Fullback.

He first came to stardom as Australian Under 21s player in 1995. Signed to Randwick Rugby Club in 1998, a club he played for since 1995, he was awarded The Daily Telegraph Rookie of the Year award. He later moved to New South Wales Waratahs.

He was included in the Australian Commonwealth Games Rugby Sevens twice in consecutive games, becoming a bronze medalist with his teammates.

He has also played as an international rugby player, notably playing for Petrarca Rugby based in Padova, Italy and Benetton Treviso, Italy in the professional Italian rugby union as a wing (fullback).

Brendan retired from professional rugby playing his last game on 2 May, at home against Glasgow Warriors losing the match 16-38.

Honours
 National Championship of Excellence
 Champions Benetton Treviso: 2002–2003, 2003–2004, 2005–2006, 2006–2007, 2008–2009
 Coppa Italia
 Champions Benetton Treviso: 2004–2005, 2009–2010
 Italian Super Cup
 Champions Benetton Treviso: 2006, 2009

References

External links
 
 

Australia international rugby sevens players
Australian rugby union players
Living people
1978 births
Commonwealth Games medallists in rugby sevens
Rugby sevens players at the 1998 Commonwealth Games
Commonwealth Games bronze medallists for Australia
Commonwealth Games rugby sevens players of Australia
Male rugby sevens players
Rugby sevens players at the 2006 Commonwealth Games
Rugby union players from New South Wales
Rugby union fullbacks
Medallists at the 1998 Commonwealth Games